Woman Trap is a 1929 American drama film directed by William A. Wellman and starring Evelyn Brent. The film is focused in a four cornered love between captain Hal Skelly (Clarence Wilson), Kitty Evans (Evelyn Brent) and his good for nothing brother Ray Malone (Chester Morris). It was adapted from the play, "Brothers," by Edwin J. Burke.

Plot
Dan, a tough police captain, and Ray, a hardened criminal, are estranged brothers. When Ray faces capture, Kitty, the sister of Ray's ex-partner (whom Dan helped to convict), offers to help him escape because she sees an opportunity for revenge against Dan. She notifies the police and Dan of Ray's whereabouts, regretting her actions too late to prevent their capture. To avert arrest by his brother, Ray commits suicide. Kitty consoles Dan in his grief, and they come to an understanding over Ray's body.

Cast 
 Hal Skelly as Dan Malone
 Chester Morris as Ray Malone
 Evelyn Brent as Kitty Evans
 William B. Davidson as Watts
 Effie Ellsler as Mrs. Malone
 Guy Oliver as Mr. Evans
 Leslie Fenton as Eddie Evans
 Charles Giblyn as Smith
 Joseph L. Mankiewicz as Reporter 
 Clarence Wilson as Detective Captain
 Sailor Vincent as himself - a boxer 
 Virginia Bruce as Nurse

References

External links

1929 films
1929 drama films
American drama films
American black-and-white films
Films directed by William A. Wellman
Films scored by Karl Hajos
1920s English-language films
1920s American films